The Panarea class is a series of four coastal oil tankers of the Italian Navy designated as Moto Cisterna Costiera, MCC (NATO YOG). Since 5 October 2005 all vessels carry the motto Prompti ad Agendum.

Ships

References

External links
 Panarea (A 5370) Marina Militare website

Ships built in La Spezia
Ships built in Italy
Auxiliary ships of the Italian Navy
Auxiliary replenishment ship classes